Nahor, Nachor, or Naghor may refer:

 Nahor, son of Serug, a person mentioned in the Bible and the father of Terah
 Nahor, son of Terah, a person mentioned in the Bible and the brother of Abraham
 Nahor, a town in the region of Aram-Naharaim that was named after the son of Terah
 Nahor, Virginia, an unincorporated community in the United States
 Nahor, Assamese name for Mesua ferrea, a tree

See also
 Nahar (disambiguation)